Loyew District or Lójeŭski Rajon is a district (raion) of Belarus located in the Gomel Region. Its administrative center is Loyew.

History 

The Battle of Loyew took place in 1649 where a numerically superior force of Ukrainian Cossacks under the command of Cossack warleaders Stepan Pobodailo and Mykhailo Krychevsky was defeated by the Polish–Lithuanian Commonwealth forces under the command of hetman Janusz Radziwiłł.

The district was founded on 8 December 1926. It has been a part of the Gomel Region since 1938, after administrative reforms introduced regions in Byelorussian Soviet Socialist Republic (BSSR). The district was dissolved for several years in the 1960s, being abolished in December 1962 and reinstated in July 1966. It has been a district of Belarus since its independence from the USSR in 1991.

Geography 
Forest makes up 37.7% of the district's land use, with 43.4% used for agricultural purposes as of 2010. It is bordered in the west and north by Brahin, Khoiniki, Rechytsa, and Gomel districts of the same region, and in the east - along the Dnieper and partly along its tributary of the Sozh - with the Chernigov oblast of Ukraine. The largest body of water is the Dnieper-Brahin Reservoir. It contains the Dnieper-Sozh nature preserve.

Demographics 
The population of the district was 12,024 as of 2017, with 6,739 living in Loyew and 5,285 living in rural settlements. The ethnic composition in the 2009 census was 92.9% Belorusian, 4.4% Russian, and 1.8% Ukrainian. The mother tongue of 87% of the population was Belorusian and for 11.6% Russian. Belorusian is spoken at home by 64.4% of the population and Russian by 32.5% of the population. The district's population has been in decline since the 1960s.

Administrative Division 
The district encompasses one urban settlement and seven rural councils, which contain a total of 71 settlements.

References 

 
Districts of Gomel Region